is a Japanese voice actress and singer affiliated with Holy Peak. Some of her most prominent roles include that of Tadamichi Aoba in Dan Doh!!, Setsuna Sakurazaki in Negima! Magister Negi Magi, Dan Kuso in Bakugan Battle Brawlers, Misaki Hijiri in Saint October, Kaede Kimura in Sayonara, Zetsubou-Sensei, Sasha Blouse in Attack on Titan, Lucina in the Japanese version of the Fire Emblem series, Luka Urushibara in Steins;Gate, and Charlotte Roselei in Black Clover, among others.

Biography
Before venturing as a voice actress, Kobayashi worked as a model for magazines. In 2003, she auditioned for the role of Setsuna Sakurazaki in Negima! Magister Negi Magi, beginning her career as a voice actress. In 2007, she made her debut as a singer with the single Sora no Kotoba, which was the second closing theme of the Saint October anime. In 2008, she was nominated for "Best New Actress" at the second edition of the Seiyū Awards. Also in that same year, she released her first album YOU&YU and her first mini-album, ROCK YOU!!. Later, in 2010, she created the musical group Crush Tears.

On August 1, 2012, Rakugo CD "Moouchi!" is released. On December 29, 2017, she announced her marriage on her Twitter account.

Filmography

Anime TV series

Original video animation (OVA)

Original net animation (ONA)

Anime films

Video games

Dubbing

Live-action TV series

Animated TV series
 Arcane (2021), Vi – Originally performed by Hailee Steinfeld

Live-action film
 Morbius (2022), Martine Bancroft – Originally performed by Adria Arjona

Audio dramas

Live-action
Anime Supremacy! (2022), Shiori (voice)

Notes

References

External links
 
Official agency profile 

1982 births
Living people
Anime singers
Japanese women pop singers
Japanese video game actresses
Japanese voice actresses
Singers from Tokyo
Voice actresses from Tokyo
21st-century Japanese actresses
21st-century Japanese singers
21st-century Japanese women singers